is a Japanese manga series written and illustrated by Yū Azuki. The eponymous protagonist is a naive young ninja from the Iga province called Kagemaru (absolute shadow), nicknamed Kabamaru (hippo's mouth) for his insatiable appetite. After the death of his strict grandfather and ninja sensei, Kabamaru moves to Tokyo with one of his grandfather's acquaintances. The plot deals mainly with Kabamaru adjusting to an urban lifestyle after spending a childhood in the mountains, him developing feelings for his guardian's granddaughter, and how he finds himself caught up in the rivalry between two private schools.

Igano Kabamaru has been adapted to an anime series and a live-action film.

Plot
Kabamaru was orphaned at a young age and raised by his grandfather , who trained Kabamaru and another young orphan,  in the ninja arts. Kabamaru is in his adolescence when his grandfather dies. At his funeral, he meets an elderly lady called . Saizō was Ran's first love and he had asked her in a letter to take care of his grandson when he died. Kabamaru follows Ran back to Tokyo, where he is to stay in her house and attend Kin'gyoku (Golden Rules) School, of which Ran is the headmistress.

On arriving, Kabamaru meets , Ran's granddaughter, who has lived with her ever since the death of her parents. Kabamaru takes a liking to Mai, but she finds his coarse manners and endless appetite embarrassing and repulsive.

Kabamaru becomes an unwitting pawn of the student council members in their various machinations.

Complicating matters is the return of Kabamaru's onetime friend, now rival, Hayate. Hayate reveals to Kabamaru that he used him in order to escape from Saizō and leave his past in the mountains behind. He urges Kabamaru to forget their friendship and stay in the mountains.

Maejima extends his control over the student councils of other schools, forming secret "assault squads" there and enlisting members of criminal gangs to do his dirty work. Shizune enlists Kabamaru to help him in the fight against Ōgyoku. Mai visits Ōgyoku School to personally talk to Maejima and ask him to stop, but Maejima's goons mistake her as Shizune's accomplice and capture her. News of Mai's kidnapping and Shirakawa's injury reach Shizune, along with a one-on-one challenge from Maejima at the docks. This time, both cheat by bringing their gangs with them and an all-out confrontation between the students and staff of the two schools ensues. This is cut short when Hayate challenges Kabamaru, revealing himself as Mai's kidnapper.

Kabamaru's rage temporarily overcomes him, and they begin fighting. During the fight, Kabamaru strikes Hayate in the shoulder and causes him to fall in the water. Just as everyone thinks Hayate has drowned, he emerges from the water, along with grandfather Saizō, who faked his death to introduce Kabamaru to the second stage of ninja training and the responsibilities of an adult. Hayate and Kabamaru, now reconciled, decide to return with Saizō to the mountains to continue their training, but not before Mai expresses her newfound feelings to Kabamaru and they promise to meet again.

Characters
Kabamaru Igano: Ryūsei Nakao
 Young Kabamaru: Masako Nozawa
Mai Ookubo: Mai Tachihara
Hayate Kirino: Hideyuki Tanaka
 Young Hayate: Eiko Yamada
Shizune Mejiro: Akira Kamiya
Saizō Igano: Kenichi Ogata
 Young Saizō: Ryūsei Nakao
Ran Ookubo: Eiko Yamada
Suu Matsuno: Masako Nozawa
Vice Principal: Yūsaku Yara
Kaoru Nonogusa: Youko Asagami
Shirakawa: Daisuke Gōri
Shū Maejima: Akio Nojima
Futaba Mejiro: Kenjirō Ishimaru
Kaname Mejiro: Shigeru Chiba

Media

Manga
The Igano Kabamaru manga was serialized in Bessatsu Margaret from 1979 to 1981, with total 12 volumes of books released.

In 2015 a new manga sequel of Igano Kabamaru was released, titled "Igano Kabamaru Sorikara" (伊賀野カバ丸★そりから) serialized in "Monthly YOU" magazine.

Anime
The anime series was produced by Group TAC and Toho. The 24 episodes were broadcast in Japan by Nippon Television between October 20, 1983, and March 29, 1984, every Thursday from 19:00 to 19:30.

Despite that in Japan there was low popularity, it acquired immense popularity in Greece. One main reason for this was the low quality of English-based dubbing often called "so bad that it's actually good", but it nevertheless impacted the growth of anime in the country.

Film
A live action film based on the plot of the manga and the anime was released on August 6, 1983, directed by Norifumi Suzuki. It starred Hikaru Kurosaki as Kabamaru, Kumiko Takeda as Mai, Sanada Hiroyuki as Shizune and Sonny Chiba as Saizō.

The plot centers around a five-part competition between Kabamaru representing Kin'gyoku School, and Hayate representing Ōgyoku School. The five events are falling from a height on a balloon (Kabamaru wins), swimming (Hayate wins), throwing shuriken while horseriding (Kabamaru wins), food eating contest (Hayate wins - Kabamaru is disqualified because he missed an olive) and remaining on the roof of a car driven by a student of the opponent school (Kabamaru wins after being promised 1,000 plates of yakisoba noodles by Shijune).

References

External links

1979 manga
1983 anime television series debuts
1983 films
Group TAC
Japanese comedy films
Live-action films based on manga
Ninja in anime and manga
Shōjo manga
Shueisha franchises
Shueisha manga
Films directed by Norifumi Suzuki
Films scored by Kentarō Haneda